Elena Iuliana Pavel (born 26 March 1984) is a Romanian retired footballer who played as a defender. She has been a member of the Romania women's national team. She previously played for CFF Clujana, with whom she played the UEFA Women's Cup, and Motorul Oradea.

She first played with the Romanian national team in the last match of the 2001 European Championship qualifying against Estonia. In the 2011 World Cup qualifying she scored against Bosnia and Herzegovina.

In January 2016 Pavel was annoyed when the male referee asked her on a date during a Primera División match versus Santa Teresa CD. Unimpressed by his advances ("Hey brown hair, let's get coffee this afternoon") Pavel answered: "Better stick to blowing your whistle".

References

External links
 
 
 Profile at La Liga 

1984 births
Living people
Romanian women's footballers
Romanian expatriate sportspeople in Spain
Romania women's international footballers
Expatriate women's footballers in Spain
Sporting de Huelva players
Primera División (women) players
Sportspeople from Constanța
Women's association football defenders
CFF Clujana players